Klaus Jakobsen (born 30 January 1989) is a speedway rider from Denmark.

Speedway career
He rode in the top tier of British Speedway, riding for the Peterborough Panthers during the 2010 Elite League speedway season. He began his British career riding for Stoke Potters in 2008.

References 

1989 births
Living people
Danish speedway riders
Peterborough Panthers riders